Abu Tayur-e Seh (also Romanized as Abū Ţayūr-e Seh) is a village in Shoaybiyeh-ye Sharqi Rural District, Shadravan District, Shushtar County, Khuzestan Province, Iran. At the 2006 census, its population was 215, in 40 families.

References 

Populated places in Shushtar County